Pratishtha is the ritual consecration of religious images including statues in Hinduism and Jainism. This may mean

 Panch Kalyanaka Pratishtha Mahotsava, a ritual in Jainism
 Prana Pratishtha, a ritual in Hindu Yogini temples